Emlen Elementary School, formerly Eleanor Cope Emlen School of Practice, is an historic elementary school located in the Mount Airy neighborhood of Philadelphia, Pennsylvania. It is part of the School District of Philadelphia. 

The building was added to the National Register of Historic Places in 1988.

History and features
The building was designed by Irwin T. Catharine and built in 1925–1926. It is a three-story, nine bay, brick building on a raised basement in the Late Gothic Revival-style. An auditorium addition was built in 1930. It features a central two-story bay window, stone surrounds, and a crenelated parapet.  

It was used as an "observation school" for teacher education and training.

The building was added to the National Register of Historic Places in 1988.

References

External links

School buildings on the National Register of Historic Places in Philadelphia
Gothic Revival architecture in Pennsylvania
School buildings completed in 1926
Mount Airy, Philadelphia
School District of Philadelphia
Public elementary schools in Philadelphia
1926 establishments in Pennsylvania